Bifröst University is located in the valley of Norðurárdalur, approximately 30 kilometers north of Borgarnes, Iceland. Originally a business school, it also offers degrees in law and social sciences, at both bachelor's and master's level, as well as a remedial university preparatory course. As of 2011, the university had 573 enrolled students. Student and staff housing surrounds the school, which with Hólar University College is one of two real “campus universities” in Iceland. However, many enrolled students are in distance learning programs.

History
The university was founded in Reykjavík in 1918 as a secondary school called the Cooperative College (Samvinnuskólinn). The school was run by the Icelandic cooperative movement (Samband íslenskra samvinnufélaga) and was originally intended as a training college for the staff of cooperative stores and other members of the movement. The founder and first head of the school was Jónas Jónsson from Hrifla, who was for many years a member of Parliament for the Progressive Party. He had studied at Askov Folk High School in Denmark and Ruskin College in Oxford, and his ideas about education were innovative for the time.

In 1955, the school moved to its present location in the scenic countryside of Norðurárdalur. Within walking distance of campus are Lake Hreðavatn, the waterfall Glanni, and the volcanic cones of Grábrók and Grábrókarfell. At first, the school offered a two-year residential program in retail management for students aged roughly sixteen to eighteen. During the 1980s and the 1990s, the school slowly transformed into a university-level institution offering diploma and bachelor's programs in business.

In 1998, a tunnel was opened which reduced the driving time from Reykjavík to Bifröst to around an hour and a half, changes in Icelandic society increased the demand for higher education, and new legislation authorized universities to charge fees. Bifröst took advantage of these developments, expanded its programs and student numbers considerably, and began charging tuition to students in addition to receiving state support.

In 2006, the institution's name was changed from Bifröst School of Business to Bifröst University. Later that year, the school's rector resigned amid controversy, partly involving allegations of financial mismanagement.

Courses
Bifröst offers a few Exchange Program Courses in English. A draft of these courses in 2020 are:

 Business courses
 Economics and Political courses
 Language courses (Icelandic Language and Culture)

Campus life
On and around the university are a kindergarten, housing for students and some staff, and recreation facilities (including a fitness room, sauna, hot tubs, solarium, and soccer and basketball fields). Older children are taken by bus to the nearby school at Varmaland.

See also
 Skemman.is (digital library)

References

 
Educational institutions established in 1918
1918 establishments in Iceland